Krystian Bielik (born 4 January 1998) is a Polish professional footballer who plays as a centre back and defensive midfielder for  club Birmingham City, on loan from  club Derby County, and for the Poland national team.

He first played senior football with Legia Warsaw in 2014, and after joining Arsenal in 2015, spent the second half of the 2016–17 season on loan at EFL Championship club Birmingham City, and then the 2018–19 season on loan at Charlton Athletic, helping them gain promotion from League One. He joined Derby in August 2019.

Club career

Legia Warszawa
Bielik started playing football for his hometown club, Górnik Konin before being spotted by Lech Poznań scouts in 2012, and later joining their developmental academy. He won the Polish U-17 Championships with the club in early 2014. However, in July 2014, Bielik joined Lech's archrivals, Legia Warszawa for 50,000 zł (£9,000), and on 24 August, he made his Ekstraklasa debut against Korona Kielce.

Arsenal

Arsenal completed a reported £2.4 million deal for the 17-year-old Bielik on 21 January 2015; the fee was officially undisclosed.

Bielik made his senior Arsenal debut in the League Cup fourth round on 27 October 2015, replacing fellow debutant Glen Kamara after 60 minutes of a 3–0 loss at Sheffield Wednesday. He was a member of the Arsenal under-21 team that reached the 2015–16 U21 Premier League Division 2 play-off final, held at the Emirates Stadium in May 2016, in which they beat Aston Villa U21 3–1.

Birmingham City (loan)
On 31 January 2017, Bielik joined EFL Championship club Birmingham City on loan until the end of the 2016–17 season. He made his debut in the starting eleven for the visit to Preston North End on 14 February, and played the whole match as Birmingham lost 2–1. His next appearance was ten days later, as a substitute after centre-back Paul Robinson was sent off with Birmingham 2–0 up away to Wolverhampton Wanderers. Bielik partnered Ryan Shotton in central defence as Birmingham conceded once but, thanks in part to his "two last-ditch challenges in the closing stages", managed to hold on for the win. Playing on the right of a back three alongside Shotton and Robinson in mid-March against Newcastle United, Bielik contributed to a clean sheet, a performance that confirmed his place in the starting eleven for the next few weeks and encouraged manager Gianfranco Zola to consider trying to loan him again in 2017–18.

Zola's dismissal coincided with the return to fitness of Michael Morrison and Birmingham's need for points, and incoming manager Harry Redknapp reverted to a back four and prioritised playing to the team's strengths for the last three matches of the season. He used Bielik only in the final match, away to Bristol City, as a substitute playing in front of the defence to help the team hold on to their one-goal lead and thus avoid relegation to League One.

Walsall (loan)
A shoulder injury that required surgery prevented Bielik going out on loan in the summer 2017 transfer window, but on 31 January 2018, he signed for Walsall of League One on loan until the end of the season.

Charlton Athletic (loan)
On 16 August 2018, Bielik joined Charlton Athletic on a season-long loan. His first senior goal gave Charlton a 2–1 win against Southend United on 1 September. He scored in the League One play-off semifinals against Doncaster Rovers, and was awarded Man of the Match in the final against Sunderland, a 2–1 victory at Wembley Stadium by which Charlton Athletic secured promotion to the Championship.

He played 34 games in all competitions and scored 4 goals during his spell at Charlton, used in both centre back and defensive midfielder positions.

Derby County
On 2 August 2019, Bielik joined Derby County on a five-year contract. The fee was undisclosed, but reported by the Telegraph as an initial fee of below Derby's record fee paid of £8 million, plus performance-related clauses that could take it "towards the £10 million mark".

In January 2020, Bielik was stretchered off in an under-23 match with what proved to be an anterior cruciate ligament injury. This kept him out of action for the remainder of the 2019–20 season. Bielik made his return to action in November 2020, returning in a 2–0 home defeat to Barnsley that saw Derby fall to bottom of the Championship. He scored his first goal for Derby in a 4–0 win over Birmingham City on 29 December.

On 30 January 2021, Bielik suffered another ACL injury that kept him out for the rest of the year. Bielik made his long-awaited return a year to the day since he suffered it, coming off of the bench and scoring a 96th-minute equaliser with an overhead kick as Derby got a much-needed 2–2 draw with Birmingham City. He made 15 appearances by the end of the season as Derby were relegated to League One, and regained his international place, but was told by Poland's manager Czesław Michniewicz that he would not be considered for the 2022 World Cup if he were a third-tier player.

Return to Birmingham City on loan
Bielik rejoined Championship club Birmingham City on 29 July 2022 on loan for the 2022–23 season.

International career
Bielik was named in Poland's squad for the 2017 UEFA European Under-21 Championship, but did not play.

He was called up for the 2019 UEFA European Under-21 Championship, at which he scored twice in three matches.

Bielik received his first call-up to Poland's senior team for UEFA Euro 2020 qualifiers in September 2019. He made his debut on 6 September 2019 as a 70th-minute substitute in a 2–0 loss to Slovenia, and started three days later in a goalless draw with Austria.

Style of play
Bielik can play either as a centre back or as a defensive midfielder. He is known for his technique, passing ability and also his aerial dominance.

Career statistics

International

Honours
Arsenal U21
U21 Premier League Division 2 play-offs:  2015–16

Charlton Athletic
EFL League One play-offs: 2019

References

External links
 
 Arsenal Profile
 

1998 births
Living people
People from Konin
Sportspeople from Greater Poland Voivodeship
Polish footballers
Poland youth international footballers
Poland under-21 international footballers
Poland international footballers
Association football midfielders
Association football defenders
Lech Poznań players
Legia Warsaw players
Arsenal F.C. players
Birmingham City F.C. players
Walsall F.C. players
Charlton Athletic F.C. players
Derby County F.C. players
Ekstraklasa players
English Football League players
2022 FIFA World Cup players
Polish expatriate footballers
Expatriate footballers in England
Polish expatriate sportspeople in England